Clavibacter sepedonicus is a species of bacteria in the genus Clavibacter. C. sepedonicus is a high-profile alien plant pathogen of A2 Quarantine status affecting only potatoes. It causes a disease in potatoes known as 'ring rot' due to the way it rots vascular tissue inside potato tubers It is present in parts of Europe but is under statutory control under 'Council Directive 93/85/EEC' of 4 October 1993 on the control of potato ring rot. This means that if an outbreak occurs, the outbreak must be controlled and if possible the disease has to be eradicated. If necessary, prohibitions are put into place to prevent further spread.

A plant showing symptoms of ring rot should be reported to the local plant health authority.

Hosts and symptoms 
C. sepidonicus is an economically important pathogen because it affects only potato, which was the 12th highest ranking commodity in 2009, generating $44,128,413,000 globally. Like all bacteria in the genus Clavibacter, C. sepidonicus causes a systemic vascular infection by invading the xylem vessels and multiplying there which sometimes leads to plugged xylem vessels. When diagnosing a C. sepidonicus infection in potato, look for discoloration of the vascular ring within the tuber that has been described as "glassy" or "water-soaked" with the ooze inside having a "cheese-like consistency".

Symptoms of potato 'ring rot' are yellowing of the leaf margins which later turn brown and look like they are burned. Tubers rot from the inside, sometimes progressing to leave hollow shells. Rotting of the tubers is the more common symptom. Infected land cannot be used again for susceptible crops for several years. Among others, United States, Canada, many EU states and Middle Eastern countries have not yet been able to eradicate this pathogen.

Disease cycle 
The causal agent of Ring Rot of Potato overwinters many different ways.  The bacteria survives in infected tubers in both storage and in the field.  Diseased tubers then infect newly planted tubers. The bacterium also may be foundas dried slime on machinery or containers. For instance, if a knife cuts into an infected tuber, the next 20 tubers that the knife cuts have a high risk of becoming infected. The bacteria enters the host through wounds and invades the xylem where it multiplies via binary fission. If colonization is successful, the bacteria may plug the xylem vessels. In advanced stages of infection, the bacteria will move out of the vessels and break down the surrounding parenchyma tissue before moving into new vessels. The bacteria may also invade the roots and cause them to deteriorate.

C. sepidonicus spreads by contaminated soil, surfaces, infected seed, wash waters, infected potato waste, etc. It can survive on warehouse walls, boxes, bags etc. On machinery in dry conditions, it can survive at least a month – sometimes in the form of dried bacterial ooze.  It is also able to overwinter in soil in association with plant debris. C. sepidonicus will only survive in the soil as long as the host tissue in which it resides persists and resists decomposition by saprophytic microorganisms in the soil. This poor ability to compete as a saprophyte in the absence of a susceptible host makes Clavibacter sp. known as soil invaders as opposed to soil inhabitants.

Environment 
North, Northwest and Central Europe have favorable climates for virulence. The disease multiplies rapidly and survives longer in cooler environments around 21 °C. At favorable conditions, the pathogen can survive 63 months in infected potato stems and 18 months in burlap sacks.

Management 
In the UK, DEFRA Plant Health and Seed Inspectors (PHSI) and SEERAD carry out annual survey work on ware and seed potatoes. Samples are sent to the Fera Science which was formerly known as The Central Science Laboratory (for England and Wales) and to Scottish Agricultural Science Agency (SASA) (for Scotland) for latent infection testing (infected but not showing symptoms). Infected crops once identified are intercepted, impounded, and destroyed. additional text. In the EU, quarantine facilities and licences are required to obtain, hold, and/or work with the bacteria and in the UK, Department of Trade and Industry (DTI) export licences are required to export it to countries outside of the EU whether through a third party country or not. The last known outbreak in the UK was in August 2004.

There are no chemicals to treat ring rot of potato. There are no resistant varieties either. If a tuber tests positive for Clavibacter sepidonicus, proper authorities should be immediately contacted as this is a quarantine disease in the United States as well Europe.

Subsp. sepidonicus presents a danger of long-distance dispersal due to its ability to survive in seeds.

References

Microbacteriaceae
Bacteria described in 1914